Alexander Lowry (born 23 June 2003) is a Scottish professional footballer who plays as a midfielder for Scottish Premiership club Rangers.

Club career
Lowry is a product of the Rangers youth system, having joined the club as a ten year old. He played in the junior and B team and signed a contract with the club until the summer of 2023. 

Lowry made his first-team debut for Rangers on 21 January 2022, in a Scottish Cup match against Stirling Albion, coming on as a first half substitute for Ianis Hagi. He also scored the opening goal of the match in the 31st minute. Lowry then started the following match for Rangers, a Scottish Premiership tie against Livingston, playing the full match in midfield. In May 2022, he signed a new contract with Rangers that is due to run until 2025.

International career
Lowry has played youth international football for Scotland at under-16, under-19 and under-21 levels. He received his first call-up to the Scotland under-21 squad in May 2022. He made his debut for the under-21 team in November 2022, in a friendly against Iceland at Fir Park.

Career statistics

Honours
Rangers
Scottish Cup: 2021–22

References

External links
Profile at the Rangers F.C. website

2003 births
Living people
Scottish footballers
Association football midfielders
Scotland youth international footballers
Scottish Professional Football League players
Rangers F.C. players
Footballers from Glasgow
Lowland Football League players
Scotland under-21 international footballers